Jana Kubovčáková is a retired Czechoslovak slalom canoeist of Slovak nationality who competed in the 1970s. She won a bronze medal in the K1 team event at the 1975 ICF Canoe Slalom World Championships in Skopje.

References

External links 
 Jana KUBOVCAKOVA at CanoeSlalom.net

Czechoslovak female canoeists
Living people
Year of birth missing (living people)
Medalists at the ICF Canoe Slalom World Championships